Butyl chloride (C4H9Cl) may refer to:

 n-Butyl chloride (butan-1-chloride)
 sec-Butyl chloride (butan-2-chloride)
 Isobutyl chloride (1-chloro-2-methylpropane)
 tert-Butyl chloride (2-chloro-2-methylpropane)

Chloroalkanes